This article lists software and hardware that emulates computing platforms.

The host in this article is the system running the emulator, and the guest is the system being emulated.

The list is organized by guest operating system (the system being emulated), grouped by word length. Each section contains a list of emulators capable of emulating the specified guest, details of the range of guest systems able to be emulated, and the required host environment and licensing.

64-bit guest systems

ARM aarch64

AlphaServer

IBM

Silicon Graphics

UltraSPARC

x86-64 platforms (64-bit PC and compatible hardware)

60-bit guest systems

60-bit CDC 6000 series and Cyber mainframe

48-bit guest systems

English Electric KDF9

36-bit guest systems

DEC PDP-10

GE-600 series / Honeywell 6000 series

IBM 7094

32-bit guest systems

32-bit IBM mainframe

Acorn Archimedes, A7000, RiscPC, Phoebe 

While the ARM processor in the Acorn Archimedes is a 32-bit chip, it only had 26-bit addressing making an ARM/Archimedes emulator, such as Aemulor or others below, necessary for 26-bit compatibility, for later ARM processors have mostly dropped it.

Amiga

Android 
BlueStacks
Genymotion
LeapDroid
App Inventor for Android
Android Studio
MEmu
Android-x86
Nox App Player
Windows Subsystem for Android

Apple Lisa

Apple Macintosh with 680x0 CPU

Macintosh with PowerPC CPU

Atari ST/STE/Falcon

AT&T UNIX PC

Cobalt Qube

Corel NetWinder

DEC VAX

DECstation

Motorola 88000

Sharp X68000

Sinclair QL

SPARCstation

x86 platforms (32-bit PC and compatible hardware)

24-bit guest systems

ICL 1900

SDS 900-series

20-bit guest systems

GE-200 series

PERQ

18-bit guest systems

DEC PDP-1

DEC PDP-4/7/9/15

16-bit guest systems

Apple IIGS

NEC PC-9800 series

DEC PDP-11

Mera 400 
Polish minicomputer Mera 400. Also in development hardware emulator in FPGA.

Texas Instruments TI-99/4 and TI-99/4A

Texas Instruments TI-980

Texas Instruments TI-990

Varian Data Machines

x86-16 IBM PC/XT/AT compatible

12-bit guest systems

DEC PDP-8

8-bit guest systems

Acorn Atom

Acorn Electron

Altair 8800

Amstrad CPC

Apple-1

Apple II

Apple ///

Atari 8-bit family

BBC Micro

Commodore 64

Commodore Plus/4

VIC-20

Enterprise 64/128

Fairlight CMI IIx

Jupiter ACE

Mattel Aquarius

MicroBee

MSX

NEC PC-8800 series

Oric

SAM Coupé

Sharp MZ

Sinclair ZX80

Sinclair ZX81

Sinclair ZX Spectrum and clones 
For Sinclair ZX Spectrum and clones

Tandy 1000

Thomson MO5

TRS-80

PDA and smartphone guest systems

Pocket PC

Calculator guest systems

Hewlett-Packard calculators

Texas Instruments calculators

See also 
 Comparison of platform virtualization software
 List of emulators
 List of video game emulators

References 

Emulators, Computer system
Computer system emulators